Robin Sadler (born March 31, 1955) is a Canadian and Austrian former professional ice hockey defenceman. He was drafted in the first round, ninth overall, of the 1975 NHL Amateur Draft by the Montreal Canadiens; in addition, he was drafted in the second round, 18th overall, of the 1975 WHA Amateur Draft by the Michigan Stags. However, Sadler never played in either the National Hockey League or the World Hockey Association despite signing with both leagues (the Montreal Canadiens and the Edmonton Oilers respectively). Unhappy with the demands of professional hockey in North America, Sadler established a successful career in Europe instead, eventually representing Austria internationally.

Career statistics

Regular season and playoffs

International

Awards
 WCHL All-Star Team – 1975

External links

1975 NHL Amateur Draft -- Robin Sadler

1955 births
Canadian ice hockey defencemen
Edmonton Oil Kings (WCHL) players
Frölunda HC players
Ice hockey players at the 1988 Winter Olympics
Innsbrucker EV players
Living people
Michigan Stags draft picks
Montreal Canadiens draft picks
National Hockey League first-round draft picks
Nova Scotia Voyageurs players
Olympic ice hockey players of Austria
Ice hockey people from Vancouver
Wiener EV players
Canadian expatriate ice hockey players in Austria
Canadian expatriate ice hockey players in the Netherlands
Canadian expatriate ice hockey players in Sweden